Venkatappa Somashekhar (27 July 1937 – 22 August 2003) was an Indian film director, producer and screenwriter in Kannada and Malayalam cinema. In 40 years of his career as a director, he directed 49 films, including commercial successes such as Premada Kanike (1976), Shankar Guru (1978), Seetharamu (1979) and Chakravyuha (1983).
Widely known for action-oriented movies, he was much sought as a hit-machine.

Following his directorial career, he worked as the President of Kannada Film Directors Association. Recognizing his contribution to Kannada cinema, he was awarded the Puttanna Kanagal Award in 2001.

Career
In 1955, in Madras (now Chennai), at the age of 18, Somashekhar entered cinema hoping to become an actor and started as a clapperboard operator. He then appeared in uncredited film roles before working as a dubbing artist. Following this, he worked as an assistant director to popular film directors at the time, R. Nagendra Rao,  N. G. Rajan, Y. R. Swamy, Ramamurthy and Babu Rao.

Somashekhar started out as an independent director with the 1974 film Bangaarada Panjara starring Rajkumar in the lead role. The film was a commercial success. Collaborating with Rajkumar, he followed this up with other hit films such as Premada Kanike (1976), Shankar Guru (1978), Thayige Thakka Maga (1978), Havina Hede (1981) and Parashuram (1989).

He was instrumental in building the career of Shankar Nag as an action hero, directing him in films such as Seetharamu (1979), Aarada Gaaya (1980) and Devara Aata (1981).

He directed Ambareesh in the 1983 film Chakravyuha for Eshwari Productions, after their previous venture Ajith ran well. Chakravyuha, a commercial success, was remade in Hindi as Inquilaab, and revived the latter's career following a series of failures. Ambareesh went on to do a string of movies with Somashekhar, namely Gajendra, Chaduranga, Deverelliddaane, Mrugaalaya, Bete, Mr Raja and Bedi, each having a tone of a rebel hero fighting against the corrupt, earning the sobriquet "Rebel Star."

With Vishnuvardhan, he worked in the film Kalinga (1980) and Chanakya (1984). Other popular films directed by him include Point Parimala (1980), Ranaranga (1988) and S. P. Bhargavi (1981). In the late 80s, he floated a production house — Vijaya Shekhar Productions
with another director Vijay and collaborated with writer CV Shivashankar and made a string of successful movies.

Final years and death
Following his film career as a director after retiring in 1992, Somashekhar associated himself with the Kannada Film Directors Association, serving as its president and as a working committee member of the Karnataka Film Chamber of Commerce.

Recognizing his contribution to Kannada cinema, he was awarded the Puttanna Kanagal Award in 2001, for 1999–2000.

He took to agriculture in the following years and also suffered from renal disorder during this time. He died on 22 August 2003, at a hospital in St. John's Medical College, Bangalore.

Filmography

References

External links
 

1937 births
2003 deaths
Kannada film producers
Kannada film directors
Malayalam film directors
Deaths from kidney failure
Kannada screenwriters
People from Bangalore Urban district
20th-century Indian film directors
Film directors from Karnataka
Film producers from Karnataka
Screenwriters from Karnataka
20th-century Indian dramatists and playwrights
20th-century Indian screenwriters